Thalotia polysarchosa is a species of sea snail, a marine gastropod mollusk in the family Trochidae, the top snails.

Description
The height of an adult shell attains 4.5 mm.

Distribution
This marine species occurs off the Austral Islands and French Polynesia.

References

External links
 To World Register of Marine Species
 

polysarchosa
Gastropods described in 2012